Neuropsychiatric Disease and Treatment is a peer-reviewed medical journal covering research in psychiatry and neurology. The journal was established in 2005 and is published by Dove Medical Press.

External links 
 

English-language journals
Psychiatry journals
Dove Medical Press academic journals
Publications established in 2005
Neurology journals
Open access journals